The Quran contains verses believed by Muslims to be revealed to the Islamic prophet Muhammad at different times and under different circumstances – some exhorting violence against enemies and others urging restraint and conciliation. Because some verses abrogate others, and because some are thought to be general commands while others refer to specific enemies, how the verses are understood and how they relate to each other "has been a central issue in Islamic thinking on war" according to scholars such as Charles Matthews.

While numerous scholars explain  Quranic phrases on violence to be only in the context of a defensive response to oppression; violent groups have interpreted verses to endorse their violent actions and made the Quran's teachings on violence and war a topic of vigorous debate.

Abrogation

Charles Matthews writes that there is a "large debate about what the Quran commands as regards the "sword verses" and the "peace verses".  According to Matthews, "the question of the proper prioritization of these verses, and how they should be understood in relation to one another, has been a central issue for Islamic thinking about war."

Prior to the Hijra travel, Muhammad struggled non-violently against his oppressors in Mecca. It wasn't until after the exile that the Quranic revelations began to adopt a more offensive perspective.

According to Oliver Leaman, a number of Islamic jurists asserted the primacy of the "sword verses" over the conciliatory verses in specific historical circumstances.  For example, according  to Diane Morgan, Ibn Kathir (1301–1372) asserted that the Sword Verse abrogated all peace treaties that had been promulgated between Muhammad and idolaters.

Modernists reject the abrogating status of the sword verses, which would result in the abrogation (naskh) of numerous Quranic verses that counsel peace and reconciliation.

Peace and conciliation
Numerous scholars and authors, both Muslim and non-Muslim have testified to the underlying rejection of violence, cruelty, coercion, and intolerance of the Quran and its embrace of justice and self-defence. 
According to Fawzy Abdelmalek, "many Muslim scholars speak of Islam as a religion of peace and not of violence. They say that the non-Muslims misunderstand the Quran verses about Jihad and the conduct of war in Islam."

Nissim Rejwan asserts that "violence and cruelty are not in the spirit of the Quran, nor are they found in the life of the Prophet, nor in the lives of saintly Muslims."

According to Feisal Abdul Rauf, "the Quran expressly and unambiguously prohibits the use of coercion in faith because coercion would violate a fundamental human right— the right to a free conscience.  A different belief system is not deemed a legitimate cause for violence or war under Islamic law. The Quran is categorical on this: "There shall be no compulsion in religion" (Q2:256); "Say to the disbelievers [that is, atheists, or polytheists, namely those who reject God] "To you, your beliefs, to me, mine" (Q109:1–6)"

Charles Matthews characterizes the peace verses as saying that, "if others want peace, you can accept them as peaceful even if they are not Muslim."  As an example, Matthews cites the second sura which commands believers not to transgress limits in warfare: "fight in God's cause against those who fight you, but do not transgress limits [in aggression]; God does not love transgressors" (Q2:190).

Chiba and Schoenbaum argue that Islam "does not allow Muslims to fight against those who disagree with them regardless of belief system", but instead "urges its followers to treat such people kindly". Yohanan Friedmann has argued that the Quran does not promote fighting for the purposes of religious coercion, although the war as described is "religious" in the sense that the enemies of the Muslims are described as "enemies of God" (Q8:57–62).

Solomon A. Nigosian has argued that in "duty to halt aggression or to strive for the preservation of Islamic principles", fighting may be involved, where the Quran encourages them to "fight courageously and steadfastly against recalcitrant states, be they Muslim or non-Muslim." He also argues that the "Quranic statement is clear" on the issue of fighting in defence of Islam as "a duty that is to be carried out at all costs", where "God grants security to those Muslims who fight in order to halt or repel aggression".

According to Chandra Muzaffar, "The Quranic exposition on resisting aggression, oppression and injustice lays down the parameters within which fighting or the use of violence is legitimate. What this means is that one can use the Quran as the criterion for when violence is legitimate and when it is not."

In the Islamic telling of Cain and Abel, Abel tells his murderous brother that "If thou dost stretch thy hand against me to slay me, it is not for me to stretch my hand against thee to slay thee: for I do fear Allah". Some scholars, such as Jawdat Said, have identified this as an example of pacifism.

Various Ahmadis scholars like Muhammad Ali, Maulana Sadr-ud-Din, Basharat Ahmad and also the British orientalist Gottlieb Wilhelm Leitner argue that when the Quran's verses are read in context, it clearly appears that the Quran prohibits initial aggression, and allows fighting only in self-defense.

Arvind Kumar writes:

According to Khaled Abou El Fadl, "there is not a single verse in the Quran that calls for an unmitigated, unqualified, or unreserved obligation to fight the unbelievers."  According to Esposito and Mogahed, the Quran balances permission to fight the enemy with a strong mandate for making peace.

Verses on conflict

Quran scholars claim that the textual context of this particular passage is defensive war after the Treaty of Hudaybiyyah was broken by the Qurayshi-affiliated Banu Bakr tribe when they attacked the Muslim-allied tribe of Banu Khaza'a. In response, the Prophet sent a letter requesting the Quraysh to either terminate their alliance with Banu Bakr or pay a ransom. The Quraysh rejected both of Mohammad's offers, thus, breaking the treaty. It is also agreed upon that the verse refers to only the ones who broke the treaty.

The previous verse says: 

This has been used to argue that fighting is only permissible as a form of defence.

There are two points made in Quran 2:191 that may cause some debate. The first is that the killing of others is authorized in the event of "persecution;"  the second is that fighting may persist until "religion is for Allah" and there is no more "fitnah" (fitnah having many possible interpretations, the most likely being "trial" or "testing"). Quran 2:191–193

Micheline R. Ishay has argued that "the Quran justifies wars for self-defense to protect Islamic communities against internal or external aggression by non-Islamic populations, and wars waged against those who 'violate their oaths' by breaking a treaty". Mufti M. Mukarram Ahmed has also argued that the Quran encourages people to fight in self-defence. He has also argued that the Quran has been used to direct Muslims to make all possible preparations to defend themselves against enemies.

Sword Verses
There are two principal verses in the Quran (9:5 and 9:29) that are called "sword verses" though the word 'sword' does not occur in the Quran. Quran 9:5, in particular, from Surah At-Tawba is known as the Sword Verse or Verse of the Sword (Ayat al-sayf).

Reuven Firestone says that Ibn Kathir held that four of the "sword verses" refer specifically to "four types of people against whom the Muslims are obligated to fight: 9:5 refers to fighting the idolaters; 9:29 refers to fighting the Scriptuaries until they pay the poll tax; 9:73 refers to fighting those who outwardly appear as Muslims but who actually oppose Muhammad and the community of Islam, and 49:9 refers to fighting Muslims who unjustly oppress other Muslims."

Patricia Crone states that the famous Verse of the Sword is directed against a particular group accused of oath-breaking and aggression, and exempts those polytheists who remained faithful. Crone states that this verse seems to be based on the rules mentioned above. Here also it is stressed that one must stop when they do. Oliver Leaman says that Quran  implies that "non-Muslims of good will and pacific nature cannot be the targets of war simply on account of their different religious background".

Warfare

The Quran asserts that if the use of force would not have been allowed in curbing the evils by nations, the disruption and disorder caused by insurgent nations could have reached the extent that the places of worship would have become deserted and forsaken. As it states:

Javed Ahmed Ghamidi divides just warfare into two types:
 Against injustice and oppression
 Against the rejecters of truth after it has become evident to them

The first type of Jihad is generally considered eternal, but Ghamidi holds that the second is specific to people who were selected by God for delivering the truth as an obligation. They are called witnesses of the truth (Arabic:, see also Itmam al-hujjah); the implication being that they bear witness to the truth before other people in such a complete and ultimate manner that no one is left with an excuse to deny the truth. There is a dispute among Islamic jurists as to whether the act of being "witness" was only for the companions of Muhammad or whether this responsibility is still being held by modern Muslims, which may entitle them to take actions to subdue other Non-Muslim nations. Proponents of companions of Muhammad as being "the witness" translate the following verse only for the companions while others translate it for the whole Muslim nation. As in Quran:

Similarly, proponents of the companions of Muhammad as being "the witness" present the following verse to argue that the companions were chosen people as witnesses just as God chooses Messengers from mankind. As in Quran:

Following is the first verse of the Quran in which the companions of Muhammad, who had migrated from Mecca, were given permission to fight back if they were attacked:

The reason for this directive in Medina instead of Mecca considered by most Muslim scholars is that without political authority armed offensives become tantamount to spreading disorder and anarchy in the society. As one of Islamic jurist writes:

Subduing the enemy
These verses told Muslims that they should not merely fight the Banu Quraish if they resist them in offering Hajj, but the Quran goes on to say that they should continue to fight them until persecution is uprooted and Islam prevails in the whole of Arabia. Initially, Muslims were required to fulfil this responsibility even if the enemy was 10 times stronger. Afterwards, the Quran reduced the burden of this responsibility. As in Quran:

Some interpret above verses that jihad never becomes obligatory unless the military might of the Muslims reaches a certain level. In the times of Muhammad, when large-scale conversions took place in the later phase, the Quran reduced the Muslim to enemy ratio to 1:2. It seems that Muslims should not only consolidate their moral character, but it is also imperative for them to build their military might if they want to wage Jihad when the need arises. The Quran gave a similar directive to Muslims of Muhammad's times in the following words:

Other scholars consider the later command of ratio 1:2 only for a particular time.

A policy was adopted regarding the extent of the requirement that arose in wars that the Muslims had to fight. In the battles of Badr, Uhud and Tabuk, the response was much more and each Muslim was required to present his services as a combatant. As in Quran:

Quran also states that turning backs in the battlefield, except for tactical purposes, is a big sin and will bring the wrath of God. As in Quran:

Proper fighting motivation
Islamic scholars agree that Jihad should not be undertaken to gratify one's whims nor to obtain wealth and riches. Many also consider that it must also not be undertaken to conquer territories and rule them or to acquire fame or to appease the emotions of communal support, partisanship and animosity. On the contrary, it should be undertaken only for the cause of Allah as is evident from the words. As in Quran:

Muhammad, in various instances, also explained very forcefully this purport of the Quran:
 Abu Musa Ash'ari narrates that once a person came to Muhammad and said that some people fight for the spoils of war, some for fame and some to show off their valour; he then asked Muhammad: "Which of them fight in the way of Allah". Muhammad replied: "Only that person fights in the way of Allah who sets foot in the battlefield to raise high the name of Allah". Sahih Bukhari 2810
 Abu Hurayrah  narrates from Muhammad: "I swear by the Almighty that a person who is wounded in the way of Allah – and Allah knows full well who is actually wounded in His way – he would be raised on the Day of Judgement such that his colour be the colour of blood with the fragrance of musk around him". Sahih Bukhari 2803
 Ibn Jabr narrates from Muhammad: "A person whose feet become dust ridden because of [striving] in the way of Allah will never be touched by the flames of Hell". Sahih Bukhari 2811
 Sahal Ibn Sa'ad says that Muhammad once said: "To reside in a border area for a day to protect [people] against an enemy [invasion] is better than this world and everything it has". Sahih Bukhari 2892.

Similarly, as a reward for participation in such a strive, the Quran states:

 Opportunities for plunder and reward in heaven
Sura 4 verses 71–76 urge Muslims to liberate the oppressed and also warns those who stay behind and fail to fight that they shall miss out on plunder, but those who fight and slain shall go to heaven:

Most Muslim scholars consider it an eternal directive and believe that all types of oppression should be considered under this directive. Similarly, if a group of Muslims commit unwarranted aggression against some of their brothers and does not desist from it even after all attempts of reconciliation, such a group according to the Quran should be fought with:

Regulation of warfare

Islamic Law, based upon the Quran and practices of Muhammad has set down a set of laws to be observed during the lesser Jihad.

Quran forbids fighting in the sacred month and similarly within the boundaries of Haram (the area around the Grand Mosque of Mecca). But if non-Muslims disregard these sanctities, Muslims are asked to retaliate in equal measure. It is stated in Quran:

Observance of treaties and pacts is stressed in the Quran. When some Muslims were still in Mecca, and they could not migrate to Medina, the Quran stated:

Similar reports are attributed to Muhammad:

The basic principle in fighting in the Quran is that other communities should be treated as one's own. Fighting is justified for legitimate self-defence, to aid other Muslims and after a violation in the terms of a treaty, but should be stopped if these circumstances cease to exist. The principle of forgiveness is reiterated in between the assertions of the right to self-defence.

During his life, Muhammad gave various injunctions to his forces and adopted practices toward the conduct of war. The most important of these were summarized by Muhammad's companion, Abu Bakr, in the form of ten rules for the Muslim army:

These injunctions were honored by the second Caliph, Umar, during whose reign (634–644) important Muslim conquests took place. These principles were also honoured during the Crusades, as exemplified by sultans such as Saladin and al-Kamil. For example, after al-Kamil defeated the Franks during the Crusades, Oliverus Scholasticus praised the Islamic laws of war, commenting on how al-Kamil supplied the defeated Frankish army with food:

During the Battle of Siffin, the Caliph Ali stated that Islam does not permit Muslims to stop the supply of water to their enemy. In addition to the Rashidun Caliphs, hadiths attributed to Muhammad himself suggest that he stated the following regarding the Muslim conquest of Egypt:

The early Islamic treatises on international law from the 9th century onwards covered the application of Islamic economic jurisprudence, ethics and military jurisprudence to international law, and were concerned with a number of modern international law topics, including the law of treaties; the treatment of diplomats, hostages, refugees and prisoners of war; the right of asylum; conduct on the battlefield; protection of women, children and non-combatant civilians; contracts across the lines of battle; the use of poisonous weapons; and devastation of enemy territory.

Al-Anfal 39 
According to Quran 8:39, the objectives of Muslims in their fighting should be to:
 Put a stop to tumult, oppression injustice (Uproot fitnah or persecution, some scholars argue that the word fitnah means Shirk )
 Establish supremacy of God, through Islam, in the Arabian Peninsula

Military campaigns of Muhammad and his companions
After Itmam al-hujjah (clarification of religion to the addressees in its ultimate form), Jews were subdued first and had been granted amnesty because of various pacts. Those among them who violated these pacts were given the punishment of denying a Messenger of God. Muhammad exiled the tribe of Banu Qaynuqa to Khyber and that of Banu Nadir to Syria. the Banu Qaynuqa at Khyber was crushed by an attack at their strongholds. Prior to this, Abu al-Rafi and Ka'b ibn al-Ashraf were put to death in their houses. The tribe of Banu Qurayza was guilty of treachery and disloyalty in the battle of the Ahzab. When the clouds of war dispersed and the chances of an external attack no longer remained, Muhammad laid siege around them. When no hope remained, they asked Muhammad to appoint Sa'd ibn Mua'dh as an arbitrator to decide their fate. Their request was accepted. Since, at that time, no specific punishment had been revealed in the Quran about the fate of the Jews, Sa'd ibn Mua'dh announced his verdict in accordance with the Torah. As per the Torah, the punishment in such situations was that all men should be put to death; the women and children should be made slaves and the wealth of the whole nation should be distributed among the conquerors. In accordance with this verdict pronounced, all men were executed. John Esposito writes that Muhammad's use of warfare, in general, was alien neither to Arab custom nor to that of the Hebrew prophets, as both believed that God had sanctioned battle with the enemies of the Lord.

No other incident of note took place regarding the Jews until the revelation of At-Tawba, the final judgement, was declared against them:

This directive related to both the Jews and the Christians. The punishment mentioned in these verses is a show of leniency to them because they were originally adherents to monotheism. The story holds that they did not benefit from this leniency because, after Muhammad's death, they once again resorted to fraud and treachery. Consequently, the Jews of Khyber and the Christians of Najran were exiled once and for all from the Arabian peninsula by Umar. This exile actually fulfilled the following declaration of the Quran about them:

In contrast, when the polytheists of Arabia had been similarly subdued, it was proclaimed in At-Tawba that in future no pact would be made with them. They would be given a final respite of four months and then they would be humiliated in retribution for their deeds and would in no way be able to escape from this punishment. After this time limit, the declaration is made in the Quran:

After the Treaty of Hudaybiyyah, Muhammad himself singled out nations by writing letters to them. In all, they were written to the heads of eight countries. Consequently, after consolidating their rule in the Arabian peninsula, the companions launched attacks against these countries giving them two options if they wanted to avoid war: to accept faith or to become a dhimmi by paying the Jizya. None of these nations was considered to be adherents to polytheism, otherwise, they would have been treated in the same way as the Idolaters of Arabia.

Battle of Badr

Since their emigration from Mecca (622), the Muslims in Medina had depended not on farming or trading, but on continuous raids on Meccan caravans. When word of a particularly wealthy caravan escorted by Abū Sufyān, head of the Umayyad clan, reached Muhammad, a raiding party of about 300 Muslims, to be led by Muhammad himself, was organized. By filling the wells on the caravan route near Medina with sand, the Muslims lured Abū Sufyān's army to battle at Badr, near Medina, in March 624. Despite the superior numbers of the Meccan forces (about 1,000 men), the Muslims scored a complete victory, and many prominent Meccans were killed. The success at Badr was recorded in the Qurʾān as a divine sanction of the new religion: "It was not you who slew them, it was God…in order that He might test the Believers by a gracious trial from Himself" (Q8:17).

Surprise attack
The Quran commands Muslims to make a proper declaration of war prior to the commencement of military operations. Thus, surprise attacks are illegal under the Islamic jurisprudence. The Quran had similarly commanded Muhammad to give his enemies, who had violated the Treaty of Hudaybiyyah, a time period of four months to reconsider their position and negotiate. This rule, however, is not binding if the adversary has already started the war. Forcible prevention of religious practice is considered as an act of war in Islam.

Peace verses
Khaled Abou El Fadl notes several verses that can be interpreted in support of tolerance and diversity – a precondition for peaceful coexistence. Quran 49:13, 11:118–9, 5:48 indicate an expectation and acceptance of diversity among human beings: that diversity is part of "divine intent":

Abou El Fadl also notes verses giving a "mandate in favor of peace" and commanding Muslims not to "turn away unbelievers who seek to make peace".

Comparisons with the Bible
After studying the Quran in search of passages that recommended violence and comparing them with those of the Bible, American professor Philip Jenkins, who is the author of books on religious violence, came to the conclusion that the Quran is, in all, "far less bloody and less violent than ... the Bible." In the Quran, he says, violence is generally recommended only as self-defense, whereas in the Bible "[t]here is a specific kind of warfare laid down ... which we can only call genocide."

Another analysis, performed by Tom Anderson based on a text analytics software he has developed, named Odin Text, estimated that violence appears twice as much in the Old Testament as in the Quran.

See also

 The Bible and violence
Criticism of the Quran 
 Dar al-Harb
 Islam and violence
 Religion and peacebuilding
 Religious violence
 Quranic literalism
 Quranic inerrancy

Notes

References

Citations

Sources

Criticism of Islam
 
Quran
Islamic ethics